The 1904 United States presidential election in Illinois took place on November 8, 1904. All contemporary 45 states were part of the 1904 United States presidential election. State voters chose 27 electors to the Electoral College, which selected the president and vice president.

Illinois was won by the Republican nominees, incumbent President Theodore Roosevelt of New York and his running mate Charles W. Fairbanks of Indiana.

Results

Results by county

See also
 United States presidential elections in Illinois

Notes

References

Illinois
1904
1904 Illinois elections